Atanas Golomeev is a retired Bulgarian professional basketball player and coach. At a height of 2.08 m (6'10") tall, he played at the center position. He is the most decorated Bulgarian basketball player of all time. He was named one of FIBA's 50 Greatest Players, in 1991. In 2019, he was inducted into the FIBA Hall of Fame.

College career
Golomeev played college basketball at McGill University, with the McGill Redmen, in the 1968–69 season. He played in 24 games, and averaged 37.5 points per game, with a single-game scoring high of 57 points.

Club career
During his club career, Golomeev won 10 Bulgarian League championships (1967, 1968, 1970, 1971, 1972, 1973, 1978, 1979, 1981, and 1982), and 4 Bulgarian Cups (1976, 1979, 1982, and 1983).

National team career
As a member of the senior men's Bulgarian national basketball team, Golomeev participated in five EuroBasket competitions (1969, 1971, 1973, 1975, and 1977). At the EuroBasket 1973 and EuroBasket 1975, he was the top scorer of the tournament, scoring 156 and 160 points respectively. He earned EuroBasket All-Tournament Team selections four times, in 1971, 1973, 1975, and 1977 .

References

External links
FIBA Profile
FIBA Europe Profile
FIBA Hall of Fame Profile

1947 births
Living people
Basketball players from Sofia
BC CSKA Sofia players
BC Levski Sofia players
Bulgarian basketball coaches
Bulgarian men's basketball players
Centers (basketball)
FIBA Hall of Fame inductees
McGill Redmen basketball players
PBC Academic players